Peter 'Pierre' Edwards (born 23 May 1953) is a former South African rugby union player.

Playing career

Edwards played for Northern Transvaal and the Springboks. He made his international debut for the Springboks against the visiting South American Jaguars team on 26 April 1980 at the Wanderers Stadium, Johannesburg. Edwards also started in the second test against the South American Jaguars, but got injured after 12 minutes in the second half and was replaced by Gysie Pienaar. He thereafter never again played for the Springboks.

Test history

See also
List of South Africa national rugby union players – Springbok no. 499

References

1953 births
Living people
South African rugby union players
South Africa international rugby union players
Blue Bulls players
People from George, South Africa
Rugby union fullbacks
Rugby union players from the Western Cape